This is a list of airports in Latvia, sorted by location.

Latvia, officially the Republic of Latvia (Latvijas Republika), is a country in the Baltic region of Northern Europe. It is bordered to the north by Estonia, to the south by Lithuania, to the east by the Russian Federation, and to the southeast by Belarus. Across the Baltic Sea to the west lies Sweden. The capital of Latvia is Riga. The local time is GMT+2 (GMT+3 DST).

Riga International Airport is the only major airport in Latvia, carrying around 5 million passengers annually. It is the largest airport in the Baltic states and has direct flights to over 80 destinations in 30 countries. It is also the main hub of airBaltic.

In the recent years airBaltic operated also in Liepāja International Airport as well as Ventspils International Airport but operations in both of these airports were soon ceased. In 2017 airBaltic started to fly to Liepāja International Airport again. As of 2019, airBaltic flies between Riga and Liepāja three times weekly in winter and five times weekly in summer.

Currently there are plans for further development in several regional airports, including Jūrmala Airport, Liepāja, Ventspils as well as Daugavpils International Airport.



Airports

Names shown in bold indicate airports with scheduled passenger service on commercial airlines.

See also 

 Latvian Air Force
 Transport in Latvia
 List of largest airports in the Baltic states
 List of airports by ICAO code: E#EV - Latvia
 Wikipedia:WikiProject Aviation/Airline destination lists: Europe#Latvia

References 
 
 
  – includes IATA codes
  – IATA and ICAO codes, coordinates
 Airfields in Latvia - info and photos of airfields in Latvia

 
Latvia
Airports
Air
Latvia